The following is a partial list of NXP and Freescale Semiconductor products, including products formerly manufactured by Motorola until 2004. Note that NXP and Freescale merged in 2015.

Microprocessors

Early microprocessors
 Motorola MC10800 (4-bit)
 Motorola MC14500B Industrial Control Unit (ICU) (1-bit)
 Signetics 2650 (8-bit)
 Motorola 6800 (8-bit)
 Motorola 6802 (8-bit)
 Motorola 6808 (8-bit)
 Motorola 6809 (8/16-bit)

68000 series
 Motorola 68000 (16/32-bit)
 Motorola 68008 (8/16/32-bit)
 Motorola 68010 (16/32-bit)
 Motorola 68012 (16/32-bit)
 Motorola 68020 (32-bit)
 Motorola 68030 (32-bit)
 Motorola 68851 (MMU)
 Motorola 68881 (FPU)
 Motorola 68882 (FPU)
 Motorola 68040 (w/FPU)
 Motorola 68060 (w/FPU)

88000 series (RISC)
 Motorola 88100
 Motorola 88110

PowerPC and Power ISA processors
 PPC 601 ("G1")
 PPC 603/PPC 603ev ("G2")
 PPC 604/PPC 604e/PPC 604ev
 PPC 620
 PowerPC 7xx family, PowerPC 740, 750, 745, and 755 only ("PowerPC G3")
 MPC8xx (PowerQUICC)
 MPC82xx (PowerQUICC II, G2 core)
 MPC83xx (PowerQUICC II Pro, e300 core)
 MPC85xx (PowerQUICC III, e500 core)
 MPC86xx (e600 core)
 MPC87xx (future e700 core)
 Pxxxx (QorIQ, e500 cores, e5500 cores)
 Txxxx (QorIQ, e6500 cores))

ARM Cortex-A cores

i.MX 

ARM920 based:
 i.MX1 (MC9328MX1)
 i.MXL (MC9328MXL)
 i.MXS (MC9328MXS)

ARM926 based:
 i.MX21 (MC9328MX21)
 i.MX23 (MCIMX23)
 i.MX25 (MCIMX25)
 i.MX27 (MCIMX27)
 i.MX28 (MCIMX28)

ARM11 based:
 i.MX31 (MCIMX31)
 i.MX35 (MCIMX355)
 i.MX37 (MCIMX37)

Cortex-A8 based:
 i.MX51 family (e.g. MCIMX515)
 i.MX50 family (i.MX508)
 i.MX53 family (e.g. MCIMX535)

Cortex-A9 based:
 i.MX6 solo
 i.MX6 dual
 i.MX6 quad

Cortex-A7 based:

 i.MX7

Cortex-A72 based:

 i.MX8

S32 
ARM Cortex-A53 and/or ARM Cortex-M4 based:
 S32V234
S32V3xx

Layerscape / QorIQ 

ARM Cortex-A7 based:
 LS1020A
 LS1021A
 LS1022A

ARM Cortex-A9 based:
 LS1024A

ARM Cortex-A53 based:
 LS1012A
 LS1043A
 LS1046A
 LS1088A

ARM Cortex-A72 based:
 LS1028A
 LS2084A/44A
 LS2048A/44A
LS2160A (16x Cortex-A72)

Microcontrollers

6800 series

8-bit
 Motorola 6801/6803
 Motorola 6802
 Motorola 6804
 Motorola 6805/146805
 Motorola 68HC05 (CPU05) - legacy
 Freescale 68HC11 (CPU11) - legacy
 Freescale 68HC08 (CPU08) 0.65 μm, 0.5 μm and 0.25 μm technologies
 Freescale S08 (CPUS08) 0.25 μm
 Freescale RS08 (CPURS08) 0.25 μm - based on the RS08 core, an S08 with restricted CPU. less instructions set for lower cost.

16-bit
 Freescale 68HC16 (CPU16) - legacy
 Freescale 68HC12 (CPU12) - legacy
 Freescale S12 (CPU12) - still being developed
 Freescale S12X (CPU12X-1) - S12XD, S12XA... family of devices with XGATE Coprocessor. Like a DMA or I/O coprocessor.
 Freescale S12XE (CPU12X-2) - S12XE family of devices with XGATE Coprocessor, Emulated EEPROM = EEEPROM. 0.18 μm technology.

68000 series

 Freescale 683XX
 Freescale DragonBall
 Freescale ColdFire
 Freescale ColdFire+

M·CORE-based

The M·CORE-based RISC microcontrollers are 32 bit processors specifically designed for low-power electronics. M·CORE processors, like 68000 family processors, have a user mode and a supervisor mode, and in user mode both see a 32 bit PC and 16 registers, each 32 bits. The M·CORE instruction set is very different from the 68k instruction set—in particular, M·CORE is a pure load-store machine and all M·CORE instructions are 16 bit, while 68k instructions are a variety of lengths. However, 68k assembly language source code can be mechanically translated to M·CORE assembly language.

The M·CORE processor core has been licensed by Atmel for smart cards.

 MMC2001
 MMC2114

Power-Architecture
 MPC5xx
 MPC512x (e300 core)
 MPC52xx (e300 core)
 MPC55xx (e200 core)
 MPC56xx (e200 core)
 MPC57xx (e200 core)

ARM Cortex-M cores

 MXC300-30

Cortex-M0+ microcontrollers
 Kinetis L series
 Kinetis E series
 Kinetis M series
 Kinetis W series

Cortex-M4 microcontrollers
 Kinetis K series
 Kinetis KW2x series
see also: S32K

ARM7 cores

ARM7TDMI automotive microcontrollers
 MAC71xx
 MAC72xx

TPU and ETPU modules
The Time Processing Unit (TPU) and Enhanced Time Processing Unit (eTPU) are largely autonomous timing peripherals found on some Freescale parts.

 MC68332 (TPU)
 MPC5554 (PowerPC) (eTPU)
 MPC5777C (PowerPC) (eTPU2+)
 MCF5232, MCF5233, MCF5234, MCF5235 (ColdFire) (eTPU)

Digital signal processors
Note: the 56XXX series is commonly known as the 56000 series, or 56K, and similarly the 96XXX is known as the 96000 series, or 96K.

56000 series
 Motorola DSP560XX (24-bit)
 Motorola DSP563XX (16/24-bit)
 Motorola DSP566XX (16-bit)
 Motorola DSP567XX (Digital Signal Controller)
 Motorola DSP568XX (Digital Signal Controller)

96000 series
 Motorola DSP96XXX (32-bit)

StarCore series
Note: "There is no native support for floating point operations on StarCore"
 MSC8101/3 Single SC140 core, 300 MHz (End of life)
 MSC8102 Quad SC140 core, 275 MHz (Discontinued)
 MSC8122/26 Quad SC140 core, 500 MHz
 MSC711x Single SC1400 core, 200/300 MHz (Partly discontinued)
 MSC8144/E Quad SC3400 core, 1 GHz
 MSC8156/E Six-core SC3850 core, 1 GHz with MAPLE-B coprocessor
 MSC8154/E Quad-core SC3850 core, 1 GHz with MAPLE-B coprocessor
 MSC8152 Dual-core SC3850 core, 1 GHz with MAPLE-B coprocessor
 MSC8151 Single-core SC3850 core, 1 GHz with MAPLE-B coprocessor
 MSC8256 Six-core SC3850 core, 1 GHz
 MSC8254 Quad-core SC3850 core, 1 GHz
 MSC8252 Dual-core SC3850 core, 1 GHz
 MSC8251 Single-core SC3850 core, 1 GHz

MEMS Sensors
 MMA Series (Multi-G/ Multi-Axis Accelerometers)
 MPX Series Pressure
 MPR Series Proximity

Reconfigurable compute fabric device
 MRC6011

Software
 CodeWarrior Integrated Development Environment
 MQX Real Time Operating System
 FreeMaster
 Processor Expert
 PEG Graphical User Interface Development
 Sensor Toolkit
 Wireless Connectivity Toolkit

References 

Products
Lists of microprocessors
Lists of products